Circuit City is a studio album by American musician and poet Camae Ayewa, released under her alias Moor Mother. It was released on September 25, 2020 through Don Giovanni Records. Composed as a recorded soundtrack for the 2019 stage production of the same name by Ayewa, the album features contributions from the free jazz collective Irreversible Entanglements and the Circuit City Band. Lyrically, the album deals with housing inequality, private ownership and institutional racism.

The album was accompanied by a short film for the track "Act 1 - Working Machine", as well as by an essay by writer Rasheedah Phillips.

Critical reception

AllMusic critic Fred Thomas praised the record, stating: "Unflinching and raw in both its sociopolitical content and musical counterpart, Circuit City is bluntly powerful." Thomas further added: "Historically, some of the most inspired moments of free jazz were righteous responses to various forms of oppression faced by black communities, and Circuit City cements Moor Mother's voice in that lineage." Alec Holt of Clash thought that the record "carries its narrative intensity consummately from the stage to album format and represents the most conceptually accomplished project of 2020 from one of our era’s most urgent voices." Writing for Pitchfork, Andy Beta stated: "Putting avant-garde tactics to humanist ends, [Ayewa's] album is a powerful indictment of a vicious, racist cycle that needs to be broken."

Track listing
 "Act 1 - Working Machine" — 11:02
 "Act 2 - Circuit Break" — 8:40
 "Act 3 - "Time of No Time" (feat. Elon Battle)" — 9:00
 "Act 4 - No More Wires" — 12:41

Personnel
Album personnel as adapted from Bandcamp liner notes.

 Camae Ayewa — lead performer, sound designer
 Taryn Jones — scenic designer
 Kae Greenberg — lighting designer, production manager
 Ada Adhiyatma — sound designer, electronics, mixing
 Elon Battle — vocals
 Steve Montenegro — electronics
 Luke Stewart — upright bass
 Keir Neuringer — saxophone, percussion
 Tcheser Holmes — drums, percussion
 Aquiles Navarro — trumpet, percussion
 Alex Nagle — mastering
 Bob Sweeney — photography
 Rasheedah Phillips — cover

References

External links
Circuit City on Bandcamp

2020 albums
Moor Mother albums
Don Giovanni Records albums
Free jazz albums
Jazz albums by American artists
2020s spoken word albums
Poetry slam albums
Works about economic inequality
Works about poverty